Avinash Sharad Mahatekar (born 1948) is an Indian politician and member of the Republican Party of India (A). He is spokesperson of Republican Party of India (A). He was sworn as Minister of State for Social Justice and Special Assistance in Devendra Fadnavis cabinet in June 2019.  He was an activist in the Dalit Panther movement. He is an influential speaker in the Ambedkarite movement. He belongs to an Ambedkarite Buddhist family.

References

Living people
State cabinet ministers of Maharashtra
Republican Party of India (Athawale) politicians
People from Mumbai
1948 births
Marathi politicians
Indian Buddhists
20th-century Buddhists
21st-century Buddhists